Gabriel Brühl (died 1743) was a well-known robber in the then Duchy of Limburg, whose criminal career started in the 1720s and ended with his being hanged in 1743.

Brühl was a remote ancestor of the Belgian detective writer Georges Simenon, who used "Brühl" as one of his many pen names.

References

Year of birth unknown
1691 births
1743 deaths
18th-century criminals
18th-century Dutch criminals
Belgian people convicted of robbery
People executed by the Netherlands by hanging
People from Landgraaf
People of the Austrian Netherlands